Celaenorrhinus pero, the Mussoorie pied flat, is a species of hesperiid butterfly found in South Asia.

Range
The butterfly occurs in India, Myanmar, North Thailand and western China. In India, the butterfly ranges from Mussoorie (Uttarakhand) to Sikkim, Assam and Nagaland and eastwards towards Myanmar.

Status
Rare.

Cited references

See also
Hesperiidae
List of butterflies of India (Pyrginae)
List of butterflies of India (Hesperiidae)

References

Print

Online
 

pero
Butterflies of Asia
Butterflies of Indochina